Josie Pisuktie (1901, date of death unknown) was an Inuit artist.

Her work is included in the collections of the National Gallery of Canada, the Scott Polar Research Institute and the Government of Nunavut fine art collection.

References

1901 births
Year of death missing
20th-century Canadian artists
20th-century Canadian women artists
Inuit artists